Vésigneul-sur-Marne (literally Vésigneul on Marne) is a commune in the Marne department in Grand Est in north-eastern France.

See also
Communes of the Marne department

References

Vesigneulsurmarne